On Friday 19 November 2010, the BBC announced Waterloo Road would have an online spin-off mini-series, Waterloo Road Reunited. The series followed former characters of the main show, and their lives after leaving Waterloo Road.

The series began in March 2011. The first episode of Waterloo Road Reunited was uploaded at 9:00pm on 2 March 2011 on the show's official website. The final episode concluded in April 2011.

Cast and characters
Chelsee Healey as Janeece Bryant
Lauren Thomas as Aleesha Dillon
Lucy Dixon as Danielle Harker
Tachia Newall as Bolton Smilie
Thomas Milner as Paul Langley
Zaraah Abrahams as Michaela White
Dean Smith as Philip Ryan

Episodes

{| class="wikitable plainrowheaders" width="100%"
|-
|-
! style="background-color: #062A78; color: #FFFFFF;" | #
! style="background-color: #062A78; color: #FFFFFF;" | Title
! style="background-color: #062A78; color: #FFFFFF;" | Directed by
! style="background-color: #062A78; color: #FFFFFF;" | Written by
! style="background-color: #062A78; color: #FFFFFF;" | Original air date
|-

|}

References

External links
 Official website (Archive copy)
 
 

Waterloo Road (TV series)
British television spin-offs
Television series by Warner Bros. Television Studios